Bruno Génésio (born 1 September 1966) is a French football manager and former player who played as a midfielder. He is the current manager of Ligue 1 club Rennes.

Early life
Génésio was born on 1 September 1966 in Lyon.

Playing career
Génésio is a youth exponent from Olympique Lyonnais. He played 171 league games in the first team between 1985 and 1995, also representing OGC Nice on loan during the 1993–94 season.

In 1995, Génésio joined FC Martigues in the Ligue 1. He played 27 league matches for the club during the campaign, scoring once in a 2–1 home win against En Avant de Guingamp on 18 May 1996; the match was also the last professional one of his career.

Managerial career
In 1997, one year after retiring, Génésio started working as a coach for the youth categories of FC du Pays de L'Arbresle. In 1999, he was appointed manager of Villefranche in the CFA.

Génésio was sacked in 2001, with the club suffering relegation from CFA 2. He subsequently joined Racing Besançon as an assistant manager, being named at the helm of the first team for the 2005–06 season; he was relieved from his duties in March 2006.

In 2006, Génésio started to work as a scout at the first club of his senior playing career, Olympique Lyonnais. He also worked as an assistant manager of their reserve team before being named Rémi Garde's assistant in the first team in 2011. He kept the position under Garde's successor Hubert Fournier who joined the club in May 2014.

On 24 December 2015, Génésio was appointed as Lyon's head coach after the sacking of Fournier. He led the club to second position at the end of the 2015–16 Ligue 1 season. The club finished in fourth or third position in the next three Ligue 1 campaigns, with Lyon reaching the semifinals of the 2016–17 UEFA Europa League. On 14 April 2019, Génésio confirmed his departure from Lyon in the coming summer.

On 31 July 2019, Génésio joined Beijing Guoan as their head coach.

Managerial statistics

Honours

Player
Lyon
Division 2: 1988–89

Nice
Division 2: 1993–94

Individual
UNFP Manager of the Year: 2021–22

References

External links
 
 

1966 births
Living people
Footballers from Lyon
French footballers
Association football midfielders
Olympique Lyonnais players
OGC Nice players
FC Martigues players
Ligue 1 players
Ligue 2 players
French football managers
Racing Besançon managers
Olympique Lyonnais managers
Beijing Guoan F.C. managers
Stade Rennais F.C. managers
Ligue 1 managers
Chinese Super League managers
French expatriate football managers
Expatriate football managers in China
French expatriate sportspeople in China